The 2019 NBBF Nigerian Premier League was the national championship for Nigerian basketball organised by the Nigeria Basketball Federation (NBBF). The draw was held on 11 November 2019. All game were played at the National Stadium in Lagos. The winners of the President Cup qualify for the 2020 Basketball Africa League (BAL), the newly established pan-African league by FIBA and the NBA. Rivers Hoopers won its third Nigerian championship.

League stage 
The league stage was played in a round-robin format. The Atlantic Conference was played from October 12, to October 2022, in the Indoor Sports Hall of the Ahmadu Bello University in Zaria.  The Savannah Conference was played in the Indoor Sports Hall in Lagos. The top four teams advance to the Final 8.

Atlantic Conference

Savannah Conference

Final 8 
The Final 8 took place from November 12, to November 17, 2021.

Group A

Group B

Final round

Individual awards
Highest Scorer: Oyebanji Mustapha (Kwara Falcons)
Highest Rebounder: Ebuka Innocent (Raptors)
Highest Blocked Shots: Victor Anthony
Highest three points: Ginikachukwu Godpower (Raptors)

References

League
Nigeria